The Canton of Moreuil is a canton situated in the department of the Somme and in the Hauts-de-France region of northern France.

Geography 
The canton is organised around the commune of Moreuil.

Composition
At the French canton reorganisation which came into effect in March 2015, the canton was expanded from 23 to 41 communes:

Arvillers
Aubercourt
Bayonvillers
Beaucourt-en-Santerre
Beaufort-en-Santerre
Berteaucourt-lès-Thennes
Bouchoir
Braches
Caix
Cayeux-en-Santerre
La Chavatte
Chilly
Démuin
Domart-sur-la-Luce
Folies
Fouquescourt
Fransart
Fresnoy-en-Chaussée
Guillaucourt
Hailles
Hallu
Hangard
Hangest-en-Santerre
Harbonnières
Ignaucourt
Maucourt
Méharicourt
Mézières-en-Santerre
Moreuil
Morisel
La Neuville-Sire-Bernard
Parvillers-le-Quesnoy
Le Plessier-Rozainvillers
Le Quesnel
Rosières-en-Santerre
Rouvroy-en-Santerre
Thennes
Villers-aux-Érables
Vrély
Warvillers
Wiencourt-l'Équipée

Population

See also
 Arrondissements of the Somme department
 Cantons of the Somme department
 Communes of the Somme department

References

Moreuil